Ben Taub Hospital is a public hospital located in Houston, Texas within the Texas Medical Center. Having opened in May 1963, the hospital is owned and operated by the Harris Health System and is staffed by the faculty, residents, and students from Baylor College of Medicine.

Ben Taub is a Level I trauma center, one of three in Southeast Texas, the others being nearby Memorial Hermann Hospital and University of Texas Medical Branch in Galveston. Kenneth Mattox, a trauma surgeon named Best Doctor in America five times, is the head of the trauma department. With 409 licensed beds, it is one of the busiest trauma centers in the United States, caring for over 106,000 emergency patients during its last fiscal year (March 1, 2010 to February 28, 2011). Ben Taub is also the only hospital in Houston with a psychiatric emergency department open 24 hours a day.
The hospital is named after Ben Taub (1889–1982), a real estate developer and businessman whose extensive behind-the-scenes philanthropic efforts helped transform Houston.

As of 1998 the hospital district designated much of the county, including central, southern, and western portions, to Ben Taub.

History
The original Ben Taub hospital opened in May 1963 and was closed when the current Ben Taub opened on January 12, 1990. The hospital district intended to renovate the old Ben Taub and have two new additional hospitals opened, but the hospital district encountered financial difficulties in the 1990s. In 2012, the district announced that it will begin renovating the old Ben Taub for $38 million.

Births
 Vanessa Guillén (murder victim)

Notes

References
Harris County Hospital District Fact Sheet, revised 6/30/2010.

External links

 Ben Taub Hospital via Harris County Hospital District
 DeBakey Department of Surgery Summary Statement on Ben Taub Hospital

Hospital buildings completed in 1963
Hospitals in Houston
Institutions in the Texas Medical Center
Teaching hospitals in Texas
Trauma centers
Public hospitals in the United States